Dahanayake is a Sinhalese surname.

Notable people
 Charles Dahanayake, Sri Lankan academic
 Demintha Dahanayake (born 1986), Sri Lankan cricketer
 Sumanapala Dahanayake (born 1929), Ceylonese politician
 Wijaya Dahanayake, Sri Lankan politician
 Wijeyananda Dahanayake (1901–1997), Ceylonese politician

See also
 

Sinhalese surnames